Jessica Robinson is a singer from Saskatchewan. Her country music album, Hummingbird, was released in 2005. She is a native of Prince Albert, Saskatchewan, where she also works as a music teacher.

Discography

Albums

Singles

Music videos

Awards and nominations

References

External links
JessicaRobinson.net – Official site
JESSICA ROBINSON –  Dirt Road Girl
Hummingbird on cdUniverse.com

Living people
Year of birth missing (living people)
People from Prince Albert, Saskatchewan
Canadian women country singers